Max Ernst Gustav Friedrich Wielen (born 3 March 1883) was the Kripo and Gestapo police chief at Breslau. He held the rank of Obergruppenführer. After the war, he was sentenced to life imprisonment by a British military court for his complicity in the murders. However, Wielen's sentence was later reduced to 15 years, and he was released 24 October 1952, after having served about 7.5 years in custody.

Wielen was directly implicated in the Stalag Luft III murders, in which members of the RAF who were involved in the "Great Escape" were killed.

References

1883 births
Year of death missing
Nazis convicted of war crimes
German police officers
German prisoners sentenced to life imprisonment

Prisoners sentenced to life imprisonment by the British military